The Hexanchiformes  are the order consisting of the most primitive types of sharks, and numbering just seven extant species. Fossil sharks that were apparently very similar to modern sevengill species are known from Jurassic specimens.

Hexanchiform sharks have only one dorsal fin, either six or seven gill slits, and no nictitating membrane in the eyes. Shark teeth similar to those modern hexanchids are known from Devonian deposits in Antarctica and Australia, as well as Permian deposits in Japan. If these are in fact hexanchids, this may be the only extant order of elasmobranchs to have survived after the Permian extinction (and by extension, the oldest extant order of elasmobranchs).

The frilled sharks of the genus Chlamydoselachus are very different from the cow sharks, and have been proposed to be moved to a distinct order, Chlamydoselachiformes.

Classification

Living species
Family Chlamydoselachidae Garman 1884 (frilled sharks)
Chlamydoselachus Garman, 1884
Chlamydoselachus africana Ebert & Compagno, 2009 (Southern African frilled shark)
 Chlamydoselachus anguineus Garman, 1884 (frilled shark)
Family Hexanchidae J. E. Gray 1851 (cow sharks)
Heptranchias Rafinesque, 1810
 Heptranchias perlo (Bonnaterre, 1788) (sharpnose sevengill shark)
 Hexanchus Rafinesque, 1810
Hexanchus griseus (Bonnaterre, 1788) (bluntnose sixgill shark)
 Hexanchus nakamurai Teng, 1962 (bigeyed sixgill shark) 
 Hexanchus vitulus Daly-Engel, 2018 (Atlantic sixgill shark)
 Notorynchus Ayres, 1855
Notorynchus cepedianus (Péron, 1807) (broadnose sevengill shark)

Extinct species
 
Family Chlamydoselachidae
Chlamydoselachus Garman, 1884
Chlamydoselachus bracheri Pfeil, 1983
 Chlamydoselachus fiedleri Pfeil, 1983
 Chlamydoselachus garmani Welton, 1983
 Chlamydoselachus goliath Antunes & Cappetta, 2002
 Chlamydoselachus gracilis Antunes & Cappetta, 2002
 Chlamydoselachus keyesi Mannering & Hiller, 2008
 Chlamydoselachus landinii Carrillo-Briceño, Aguilera & Rodriguez, 2014
 Chlamydoselachus lawleyi Davis, 1887
 Chlamydoselachus tatere Consoli, 2008
 Chlamydoselachus thomsoni Richter & Ward, 1990
 Chlamydoselachus tobleri Leriche, 1929
Family Crassodontidanidae
Crassodontidanus Kriwet & Klug, 2011
Crassodontidanus serratus Fraas, 1855
 Crassodontidanus wiedenrothi Thies, 1983
 Notidanoides Maisey, 1986
Notidanoides muensteri Agassiz, 1843
 Notidanus Cuvier, 1816
Notidanus amalthei Oppel, 1854
 Notidanus atrox Ameghino, 1899 
 Notidanus intermedius Wagner, 1862
 Notidanus nikitini Chabakov & Zonov, 1935
 Pachyhexanchus Cappetta, 1990
Pachyhexanchus pockrandti Ward & Thies, 1987
Family Hexanchidae
Gladioserratus Underwood, Goswami, Prasad, Verma & Flynn, 2011
Gladioserratus aptiensis Pictet, 1864
 Gladioserratus dentatus Guinot, Cappetta & Adnet, 2014
 Gladioserratus magnus Underwood, Goswami, Prasad, Verma & Flynn, 2011
 Heptranchias Rafinesque, 1810
Heptranchias ezoensis Applegate & Uyeno, 1968
 Heptranchias howellii Reed, 1946
 Heptranchias karagalensis Kozlov in Zhelezko & Kozlov, 1999
 Heptranchias tenuidens Leriche, 1938
 Hexanchus Rafinesque, 1810
Hexanchus agassizi  Cappetta, 1976
 Hexanchus andersoni Jordan, 1907
 Hexanchus casieri Kozlov, 1999
 Hexanchus collinsonae Ward, 1979
 Hexanchus gracilis Davis, 1887
 Hexanchus hookeri Ward, 1979
 Hexanchus microdon Agassiz, 1843
 Hexanchus tusbairicus Kozlov in Zhelezko & Kozlov, 1999
 Notidanodon Cappetta, 1975
Notidanodon brotzeni Siverson, 1995
 Notidanodon dentatus Woodward, 1886
 Notidanodon lanceolatus Woodward, 1886
 Notidanodon loozi Vincent, 1876
 Notidanodon pectinatus Agassiz, 1843
 Notorynchus Ayres, 1855
Notorynchus borealus Jordan & Hannibal, 1923
 Notorynchus kempi Ward, 1979
 Notorynchus lawleyi Cigala Fulgosi, 1983
 Notorynchus primigenius Agassiz, 1843
 Notorynchus serratissimus Agassiz, 1843
 Notorynchus subrecurvus Oppenheimer, 1907
 Pachyhexanchus Cappetta, 1990
Pachyhexanchus pockrandti Ward & Thies, 1987
 Paraheptranchias Pfeil, 1981
Paraheptranchias repens Probst, 1879
 Pseudonotidanus Underwood & Ward, 2004
Pseudonotidanus semirugosus Underwood & Ward, 2004
 Welcommia Cappetta, 1990
Welcommia bodeuri Cappetta, 1990
 Welcommia cappettai Klug & Kriwet, 2010
 Weltonia Ward, 1979
Weltonia ancistrodon Arambourg, 1952
 Weltonia burnhamensis Ward, 1979
Family Mcmurdodontidae ?
Mcmurdodus White, 1968
Mcmurdodus featherensis White, 1968
 Mcmurdodus whitei Turner, & Young, 1987
Family Orthacodontidae
Occitanodus Guinot, Cappetta & Adnet, 2014
Occitanodus sudrei Guinot, Cappetta & Adnet, 2014
 Orthacodus Woodward, 1889
Orthacodus longidens Agassiz, 1843
 Sphenodus Agassiz, 1843
Sphenodus alpinus Gümbel, 1861
 Sphenodus longidens Agassiz, 1843
 Sphenodus lundgreni Davis, 1890
 Sphenodus macer Quenstedt, 1852
 Sphenodus nitidus Wagner, 1862
 Sphenodus planus Agassiz, 1843
 Sphenodus rectidens Emmons, 1858
 Sphenodus robustidens Seguenza, 1900
 Sphenodus tithonius Gemmellaro, 1871
 Sphenodus virgai Gemmellaro, 1871

Species

See also

 Time range of Hexanchiformes species

Footnotes

References

External links
  (Fish Base family reference)
  (Fish Base family reference)

 
Extant Middle Jurassic first appearances
Cartilaginous fish orders
Taxa named by Fernando de Buen y Lozano